Annie Schreijer-Pierik  (born 17 February 1953) is a Dutch politician and Member of the European Parliament (MEP) from the Netherlands. She is a member of the Christian Democratic Appeal, part of the European People's Party.

She runs a pig farm in the village Hengevelde, in the eastern part of the Netherlands, together with her family.

Political career
In 1991, Schreijer-Pierik was elected to the local council of Ambt Delden. In 1995, she became member of the council of the province Overijssel. From 1998 until 2010 Schreijer was a Member of the Dutch national parliament. As a Member of Parliament she chaired the Agriculture committee from 2004 until 2008.

Member of the European Parliament, 2014–present
Schreijer-Pierik was elected to the European Parliament in May 2014 thanks to 113,123 preference votes. A member of the European People's Party Group, she served on the Committee on the Environment, Public Health and Food Safety from 2014 until 2019 before moving to the Committee on Agriculture and Rural Development and the Committee on Fisheries.

In addition to her committee assignments, Schreijer-Pierik is part of the Parliament's delegation to the ACP–EU Joint Parliamentary Assembly and the MEPs Against Cancer group.

Personal life
Schreijer-Pierik married on 17 February 1974 in Diepenheim and has three children. She is a member of the Roman Catholic Church.

References

External links

1953 births
Living people
Dutch farmers
Dutch Roman Catholics
Dutch women in politics
Members of the Provincial Council of Overijssel
Members of the House of Representatives (Netherlands)
Municipal councillors in Overijssel
Christian Democratic Appeal politicians
People from Hof van Twente
MEPs for the Netherlands 2014–2019
MEPs for the Netherlands 2019–2024
21st-century women MEPs for the Netherlands